Rare Cuts may refer to:

 Rare Cuts (album), an album by Danger Danger
 Rare Cuts (EP), an EP by Bullet for My Valentine

See also

 Rare Cuts and Oddities 1966, an album by the Grateful Dead